Catholic Memorial (CM) is an all-boys college preparatory school (grades 7–12) located in West Roxbury, Massachusetts, United States. It is part of the Roman Catholic Archdiocese of Boston and is administered by the Congregation of Christian Brothers.

History 
Catholic Memorial High School, as it was called at the time, opened its doors on September 9, 1957, with 225 students and five Christian Brothers of Ireland in the former St. Theresa of Avila Parish School building. The building, now known as Donahue Hall, was donated to the Christian Brothers by Monsignor Charles A. Donahue, V.F., LL.D. who was the pastor of St. Theresa's.

The school was named "Catholic Memorial" at the suggestion of Richard Cardinal Cushing, to commemorate the sesquicentennial of the Archdiocese of Boston and as a memorial to Catholic donors.

Brother Joseph G. McKenna, C.F.C., was the first headmaster of Catholic Memorial; he opened a new school building which was dedicated by Cardinal Cushing on November 10, 1959. Three years later the classroom wing was opened and the enrollment increased to 1110 students.

In 1971 there were 22 Christian Brothers, but in 2016, only three.

The middle school opened in September 1993 with 185 students in grades 7 and 8.

Academics 
The tuition charge for the 2018–2019 school year was US$$22,000. Scholarships are awarded upon admission to students in Catholic Memorial's middle school and high school programs. The admissions committee selects students for scholarship eligibility based upon their past academic performance and the results of the entrance exams. No applications are available for scholarships; instead, every application for admission is reviewed for scholarship potential. Financial aid is available for qualifying families. Over $1 million is given annually in financial aid.

Catholic Memorial offers 31 honors and Advanced Placement courses.

College placement
Catholic Memorial is a college-preparatory institution. Students come from over 90 different towns and communities.

Community service
CM's mission includes the mandate to teach young men to "lead through service". CM students participate in numerous BERSI trips each year. These domestic and international travel experiences, build community among the students and immerse students in service experiences. Trips include the Dominican Republic and Jamaica, as well as Brownsville, Texas, and Wyoming. Additionally, a required 60-hour senior service program begins at the start of each year, with seniors serving at inner-city grammar schools, hospitals, non-profit agencies, clothing distribution centers, food pantries, and soup kitchens. Volunteers from all grades also participate in service experiences. Each year, CM students send large delegations—The Sea of Red—to the Walk for Breast Cancer.

Annual Blessed Edmund Rice Solidarity Initiative (BERSI) school trips are taken to El Salvador, Europe, Peru, Dominican Republic and, most recently South Korea and Canada.

Controversies

Anti-Semitism 
Catholic Memorial made headlines in 2016 when students chanted anti-semitic expressions at a basketball game against Newton North High School. Catholic Memorial students at the game chanted "You killed Jesus. " In response to the incident, Newton superintendent David Fleishman contacted the Anti-Defamation League, feeling that "they have a lot of work to do at Catholic Memorial." The Archdiocese of Boston called the situation "unacceptable." In a subsequent statement, Catholic Memorial indicated that they were "deeply disturbed by the behavior of a group of student spectators who made an unacceptable chant." Catholic Memorial ultimately made long-term revisions to their curriculum that would mitigate any recurrence of such an incident of antisemitism.

Athletics

Ice hockey
Catholic Memorial has consistently been ranked #1 in Massachusetts boys' ice hockey by the Boston Globe, Boston Herald, and United States High School Hockey Online (USHSHO) polls. Catholic Memorial has also been nationally ranked as the #1 team in the United States a number of times, most recently in 2008.

Extracurriculars

Athletic clubs

Journalism 
Catholic Memorial students produce a number of publications each year. Errant is CM's literary magazine, publishing original poems, stories, and artwork by students. Knight Insight is published by the in-school Journalism class, and includes school news and updates as well as submissions from students. The CM Latin Club publishes Equites, a seasonal newspaper. Yearbook Club meets year-round starting in September and produces the school's annual yearbook, moderated by Craig Spaner.

CMTV 
Catholic Memorial Television is Catholic Memorial's broadcast journalist program. Using an online live-streaming program, CMTV broadcasts a short program every morning to each homeroom, reporting news, notices, and upcoming events and sports games. In addition to broadcasting the pledge of allegiance and morning prayer, CMTV also arranges humorous skits and facilitates special announcements from school leadership. As of 2022, the club no longer does daily broadcasts.

Latin Club 
Catholic Memorial's Junior Classical League, or Latin Club, is always represented at the Massachusetts State Convention, where many CM students win prizes. It publishes Equites, a seasonal newspaper detailing the club's events and achievements.

Drama 
The Catholic Memorial Drama Club, known in the 1960s as the Genesians and later as the Catholic Memorial Players, puts on two shows a year. In the past, one play in autumn was performed annually, but later, the Drama Club added a spring musical. The following is a list of some past performances:

Honor societies 
Catholic Memorial offers multiple honor societies, ranging from individual subjects to the National Honor Society. The following is a list of active honor societies:

Speech and debate 
At Catholic Memorial, nearly every student participates in "forensics", or speech and debate, at one point in his academic career. CM faculty teach students public speaking skills through various classroom activities. In the Speech and Debate club students perform and compete inter-scholastically as they recite speeches, dramatic acts and original oratory. Since 1961 the school's Speech and Debate program have produced over 25 state and three national champions. The 2010 team won the "Founder's Award" at Nationals. The team joined the NSDA 100 Club in October, 2018 in recognition for accumulating over 100 degrees over the course of the 2017–2018 school year. The Forensics program has won two straight Massachusetts Speech and Debate league championships in 2017 and 2018. After a second-place finish in 2019, Catholic Memorial returned as champions of Massachusetts Speech and Debate League in both 2020, 2021, and 2022.

Notable alumni

Jim Carey – professional ice hockey player
Daniel F. Conley – Suffolk County District Attorney
Robert Consalvo – Boston City Councilor
Ted Donato – professional ice hockey player and coach
Brian J. Donnelly – former U.S. Congressman and Ambassador
Allen Doyle – professional golfer
Jim Fahey – professional ice hockey player
Skip Lockwood – professional baseball player
John Marino - professional hockey player
William Martin – author 
Mike McColgan – singer, Dropkick Murphys, Street Dogs
Joey McIntyre – singer, New Kids on the Block
Chris Nilan – professional ice hockey player
Chris O'Sullivan – professional ice hockey player
Jack Parker – college ice hockey coach
John H. Rogers – Massachusetts State Representative, Majority Leader
Michael F. Rush – Massachusetts State Senator
Paul Stanton – professional ice hockey player and coach
John Tobin – former Boston City Councilor, Vice President at Northeastern University, and owner of John Tobin Presents comedy production

Notable faculty 
 Ron Perry, basketball and baseball coach (1959–1972)
 Ian Moran

References

External links
School website

Boys' schools in Massachusetts
High schools in Boston
Middle schools in Boston
Congregation of Christian Brothers secondary schools
Educational institutions established in 1957
Catholic secondary schools in Massachusetts
Private middle schools in Massachusetts
1957 establishments in Massachusetts
Catholic Conference (MIAA)